Dvarčininkai (formerly) is a village in Kėdainiai district municipality, in Kaunas County, in central Lithuania. According to the 2011 census, the village had a population of 5 people.

There is a former cemetery site (a cultural heritage object).

Demography

References

Villages in Kaunas County
Kėdainiai District Municipality